Heniocha apollonia, commonly known as the southern marbled emperor, is a nocturnal species of moth in the family Saturniidae. It is indigenous to Africa.

Taxonomy 
Heniocha apollonia contains the following subspecies:

 Heniocha apollonia apollonia
 Heniocha apollonia flavida
 Heniocha apollonia terpsichorina

Recorded food plants 
Heniocha apollonia larvae have been recorded feeding on Acatia mollissima, Acacia karroo, Acacia mearnsii.

References 

Saturniinae